François Joyaux (born in 1938) is emeritus professor of East Asian civilization at the Institut national des langues et civilisations orientales where he created the diplôme des hautes études internationales. He has also taught at the université de Paris I, the École nationale d'administration and the Instituts d'études politiques of Paris and Grenoble. He is a member of the Société Asiatique.

François Joyaux is also a collector of old garden roses and is the author of books on these flowers.

He is also interested in numismatics of East Asian countries and chairs the Asian Numismatic Society.

Bibliography

Works on Asia 
1972:  Mao Tse-toung, Les Cahiers de l'Herne, n° 18 
1979: La Chine et le règlement du premier conflit d'Indochine, Genève 1954, Publications de la Sorbonne, 
1985: La nouvelle question d'Extrême-Orient, 1 L'ère de la guerre froide (1945–1959), Bibliothèque historique Payot, 
1988: La nouvelle question d'Extrême-Orient, 2 L'ère du conflit sino-soviétique (1959–1978), Bibliothèque historique Payot,  - Preface by Jean-Baptiste Duroselle
 La nouvelle question d'Extrême-Orient, 3 L'ère de l'ouverture chinoise (1979–1994) 
1991: Géopolitique de l'Extrême-Orient, Espaces et politiques, Brussels, series "Questions au XXe", 
1993: Géopolitique de l'Extrême-Orient, Frontières et stratégies, Bruxelles, Éditions Complexe, series "Questions au XXe", 
1994: La Tentation impériale. Politique extérieure de la Chine depuis 1949, éd. Imprimerie nationale, 
1993: La Politique extérieure du Japon, PUF, series "Que sais-je?" n° 2792
1994: La Politique extérieure de la Chine populaire, PUF, series "Que sais-je?", 
1998: L'Association des nations de l'Asie du Sud-Est, PUF, series "Que sais-je?" 
2019: Monnaies Impériales d´Annam, Éditions V. Gadoury, Monaco

Book on roses 
 La Rose, une passion française, 1778-1914, Éd. Complexe, 2001 
 Roses anciennes, (illustrations de Josh Westrich), Éd. Cyel, 
 Roses et rosiéristes de l'Orléanais, Éd. Hesse, 2006 ,
 Les Roses de l'impératrice : la Rosomanie au temps de Joséphine, Éd. Complexe, 2005 
 Nouvelle encyclopédie des roses anciennes, Éd. Ulmer, 2005 
 Deux siècles de roses : les créations Guillot, (illustrations by Vincent Motte, Jean-Pierre Guillot), Maison rustique / Flammarion, 2003 
 La Rose de France : Rosa gallica et sa descendance, (illustrations by Georges Lévêque), Imprimerie nationale, 1998

External links 
 « La politique extérieure de la Chine », in Pouvoirs, revue française d’études constitutionnelles et politiques, n° 81, La Chine après Deng, 1997, . Accessdate 14 October 2016. La politique extérieure de la Chine 
 François Joyaux on academia.edu (his numismatic publications
 Website of the Société de numismatique asiatique

References 

20th-century French historians
Geopoliticians
Rose breeders
French numismatists
Academic staff of Sciences Po
Members of the Société Asiatique
1938 births
Living people